Katajiri No.1 Dam is an earthfill dam located in Akita Prefecture in Japan. The dam is used for irrigation. The catchment area of the dam is 4 km2. The dam impounds about 4  ha of land when full and can store 405 thousand cubic meters of water. The construction of the dam was completed in 1963.

References

Dams in Akita Prefecture
1963 establishments in Japan